The Women's 800 metre freestyle event at the 2010 Commonwealth Games took place on 6 and 7 October 2010, at the SPM Swimming Pool Complex.

Two heats were held. The heat in which a swimmer competed did not formally matter for advancement, as the swimmers with the top eight times from the entire field qualified for the finals.

Heats

Heat 1

Heat 2

Final

References

Aquatics at the 2010 Commonwealth Games
2010 in women's swimming